Cerylon fagi is a beetle species in the subfamily Ceryloninae.

References

External links
 

Cerylonidae
Beetles described in 1867
Taxa named by Charles N. F. Brisout